Vincenzo Casillo (July 8, 1942 – January 29, 1983) was an Italian Camorrista and the second in command of the Nuova Camorra Organizzata, a Camorra organization in Naples.

Second in Command
He was one of the earliest members of the Nuova Camorra Organizzata, since its formation in 1970. Casillo was highly trusted and soon rose to become the deputy and main military chief of crime boss, Raffaele Cutolo, during the period when he was imprisoned in the prisons of Poggioreale and Ascoli Piceno. As the Nuova Camorra Organizzata's second in command, he participated in a high-level meeting with representatives of the Sicilian Mafia and Camorra clans to try to put an end to the bloody war between the Nuova Camorra Organizzata and their rivals from the Nuova Famiglia, together with Cutolo’s sister, Rosetta.

Purported involvement in the Roberto Calvi murder
In June 1996, the Sicilian Mafia pentito, Francesco Di Carlo claimed that Vincenzo Casillo together with another Camorrista, Sergio Vaccari were responsible for the murder of Roberto Calvi, the chairman of Banco Ambrosiano who was dubbed the "God's Banker". Casillo once confessed to murdering the bankrupt financier to Enrico Madonna, Cutolo's lawyer. Madonna himself was later murdered in October 1993, three days after telling a journalist that he was willing to tell a parliamentary commission all he knew about the Cirillo kidnapping affair (see below).

Negotiator in the Cirillo Kidnapping
Casillo also played an active role in negotiating the release of the Christian Democrat (DC) politician Ciro Cirillo, who had been kidnapped on April 27, 1981 by the Red Brigades. He managed to do so, in spite of being a wanted man at the time.

Assassination
On January 29, 1983, Casillo was murdered by a bomb planted under the pedal of his car, next to the SISMI Forte Boccea in Rome. Pasquale Galasso, chief of the Galasso clan and member of the rival Nuova Famiglia headed by Carmine Alfieri, was responsible for the blast. This was one of the first times that a Camorra clan had used this kind of technique to dispose of a rival.

Galasso claimed that he killed Casillo in order to free DC politician Antonio Gava and other Christian Democrats from Cutolo's threats. In a meeting held in April 1982, nine months after the kidnapping, Vincenzo Casillo reportedly told Giuliano Granata, the DC mayor who had taken part with him in the negotiations: "You did what you wanted and then washed your hands."

According to Galasso, who later became a pentito, the reasons for his murder were:
{{quote|First of all, to make it clear to Cutolo that he was finished, and that for once and for all he had to stop blackmailing the politicians and the institutions he had dealt with during the Cirillo affair. It is also beyond doubt that through that action Alfieri wanted to demonstrate to the politicians, mainly to the Dorotea faction and perhaps to Antonio Gava in particular, that he had to be reckoned with. The car bomb was therefore intended to demonstrate Alfieri's real importance."}}

Although there are some rumors that Cutolo ordered Casillo killed because he had taken Cutolo's part of the Cirillo ransom, Cutolo has stated that he was wary of the untrustworthiness of the politicians and claims to have warned Casillo after the kidnapping:

Not long after his death, his partner, the dancer Giovanna Matarazzo, declared to judge Carlo Alemi that Casillo's death was linked to the murder of Roberto Calvi. Matarazzo disappeared a few weeks after his death, and her body was eventually found in a ditch under a motorway in December 1983.

The fact that a secret service card that could be used by Casillo was found in his burnt-out car lends some credibility to the scenario that his death might have been linked to the Cirillo kidnapping.

Aftermath
Casillo's death was one of the many factors that brought about the downfall of the Nuova Camorra Organizzata. It represented a turning point in the relationship between the local politicians and the Camorra. After his death, it was clear Cutolo not only had lost his political protection but the war as well. His former political protectors turned and provided their support to his main rival Carmine Alfieri. Many other Camorra gangs understood the shift in the balance of power caused by the death of Casillo. They abandoned the Nuova Camorra Organizzata and allied themselves with Alfieri.

As the Anti-Mafia commission once wrote: 

On the turning point that had been reached with Casillo's murder, Galasso stated in court:  

The assassination of Casillo was followed by the murders of several Nuova Camorra Organizzata members by the Nuova Famiglia. Nicola Nuzzo, a key Nuova Camorra Organizzata member involved in the negotiations was battered to death in the ward of a Roman hospital in 1986, soon after a meeting with Carlo Alemi, the magistrate who was investigating the Ciro Cirillo release case. Salvatore Imperatrice, Casillo's bodyguard and also a member of the Nuova Camorra Organizzata negotiating team, died of mysterious causes - alleged by authorities to be suicide, in a mental asylum in March 1989. Mario Cuomo, who lost his legs in the explosion that killed Casillo, was eventually murdered in October 1990.

Citations

References
Behan, Tom (1996). The Camorra, London: Routledge, 

Jacquemet, Marco (1996). Credibility in Court: Communicative Practices in the Camorra Trials, Cambridge University Press 
Longrigg, Clare (1998). Mafia Women, London: Vintage 
Willan, Philip (1991), Puppetmasters: The Political Use of Terrorism in Italy'', London: Constable and Company 

1983 deaths
People from the Province of Naples
Camorristi
Murdered Camorristi
Nuova Camorra Organizzata
People murdered in Italy
Deaths by car bomb in Italy
1942 births